Cuttalossa Valley Historic District is a national historic district located in Solebury Township, Bucks County, Pennsylvania.  The district includes 23 contributing buildings, 10 contributing sites, and 4 contributing structures along the narrow valley of Cuttalossa Creek.  The district encompasses a variety of resources including dwellings, outbuildings, a mill, bridges, a fountain, and the remains of mills, dams, and mill races.  A number of the buildings exhibit vernacular Federal and Georgian style details.   Notable buildings include the Hard Times Tavern (c. 1750), Samuel Armitage House, Hill House, Watson Kenderline House, Cuttalossa Inn, and Laurelton.

It was added to the National Register of Historic Places in 2002.

Gallery

References

Historic districts in Bucks County, Pennsylvania
Georgian architecture in Pennsylvania
Federal architecture in Pennsylvania
Historic districts on the National Register of Historic Places in Pennsylvania
National Register of Historic Places in Bucks County, Pennsylvania